The Orion-class submarines were a class of two submarines built for the French Navy between 1928 and 1931.

Design

Ships

References 

 
 
Submarine classes
Ship classes of the French Navy